Morton County (standard abbreviation: MT) is a county in the southwestern corner of the U.S. state of Kansas. As of the 2020 census, the county population was 2,701. The largest city and county seat is Elkhart.

History

Early history

For many millennia, the Great Plains of North America was inhabited by nomadic Native Americans.  From the 16th century to 18th century, the Kingdom of France claimed ownership of large parts of North America.  In 1762, after the French and Indian War, France secretly ceded New France to Spain, per the Treaty of Fontainebleau.

19th century
In 1802, Spain returned most of the land to France, but keeping title to about 7,500 square miles. In 1803, most of the land for modern day Kansas was acquired by the United States from France as part of the 828,000 square mile Louisiana Purchase for 2.83 cents per acre.

In 1848, after the Mexican–American War, the territorial gain in the Treaty of Guadalupe Hidalgo with Mexico brought into the United States all or part of land for ten future states, including southwest Kansas.

From 1821 to late 1860s, the Santa Fe Trail was active across Morton County.

In 1854, the Kansas Territory was organized, then in 1861 Kansas became the 34th U.S. state. In 1886, Morton County was established, and named for Oliver Morton, who was a United States senator from Indiana from 1867 to 1877. In 1886, the community of Richfield was established as the county seat.

20th century

In the 1930s, the prosperity of the area was severely affected by its location within the Dust Bowl.  This catastrophe intensified the economic impact of the Great Depression in the region.

In 1961, the county seat was moved from Richfield to Elkhart.

Geography
The county is the location of the 8 Mile Corner tripoint, where Kansas borders Colorado and Oklahoma.

Major highways
 Kansas Highway 27
 Kansas Highway 51
 U.S. Highway 56

Adjacent counties
 Stanton County (north)
 Stevens County (east)
 Texas County, Oklahoma (south)
 Cimarron County, Oklahoma (southwest)
 Baca County, Colorado (west/Mountain Time border)

National protected area
 Cimarron National Grassland (part)

Demographics

As of the census of 2000, there were 3,496 people, 1,306 households, and 961 families residing in the county.  The population density was 5 people per square mile (2/km2).  There were 1,519 housing units at an average density of 2 per square mile (1/km2).  The racial makeup of the county was 88.39% White, 0.20% Black or African American, 1.14% Native American, 1.06% Asian, 7.52% from other races, and 1.69% from two or more races.  14.10% of the population were Hispanic or Latino of any race.

There were 1,306 households, out of which 36.60% had children under the age of 18 living with them, 64.20% were married couples living together, 6.80% had a female householder with no husband present, and 26.40% were non-families. 24.30% of all households were made up of individuals, and 9.20% had someone living alone who was 65 years of age or older.  The average household size was 2.63 and the average family size was 3.15.

In the county, the population was spread out, with 29.30% under the age of 18, 8.00% from 18 to 24, 27.20% from 25 to 44, 21.50% from 45 to 64, and 13.90% who were 65 years of age or older.  The median age was 36 years. For every 100 females there were 94.40 males.  For every 100 females age 18 and over, there were 93.70 males.

The median income for a household in the county was $37,232, and the median income for a family was $43,494. Males had a median income of $31,875 versus $19,474 for females. The per capita income for the county was $17,076.  About 8.50% of families and 10.50% of the population were below the poverty line, including 14.00% of those under age 18 and 5.20% of those age 65 or over.

Government

Morton County is usually won by the Republican candidate for president. Jimmy Carter almost carried the county in 1976, but Gerald Ford eventually won by .2%. The last time a Democrat won Morton County was Lyndon B. Johnson in 1964.

Presidential elections

Laws
The Kansas Constitution was amended in 1986 to allow the sale of alcoholic liquor by the individual drink with the approval of voters, either with or without a minimum of 30% of sales coming from food. Morton County is one of 35 counties in the state that allows for the sale of liquor by the drink without the minimum food sales stipulation.

Education

Unified school districts
 Rolla USD 217
 Elkhart USD 218

Communities

Cities
 Elkhart
 Richfield
 Rolla

Unincorporated community
 Wilburton

Townships
Morton County is divided into six townships.  None of the cities within the county are considered governmentally independent, and all figures for the townships include those of the cities.  In the following table, the population center is the largest city (or cities) included in that township's population total, if it is of a significant size.

See also
 Dry counties
 Cimarron National Grassland

References

Further reading

External links

County
 
 Morton County - Directory of Public Officials
Maps
 Morton County Maps: Current, Historic, KDOT
 Kansas Highway Maps: Current, Historic, KDOT
 Kansas Railroad Maps: Current, 1996, 1915, KDOT and Kansas Historical Society

 
Kansas counties
1886 establishments in Kansas
Populated places established in 1886